Henry II (31 March 1519 – 10 July 1559) was King of France from 31 March 1547 until his death in 1559. The second son of Francis I and Duchess Claude of Brittany, he became Dauphin of France upon the death of his elder brother Francis in 1536.

As a child, Henry and his elder brother spent over four years in captivity in Spain as hostages in exchange for their father. Henry pursued his father's policies in matters of art, war, and religion. He persevered in the Italian Wars against the Habsburgs and tried to suppress the Reformation, even as the Huguenot numbers were increasing drastically in France during his reign.

Under the April 1559 Peace of Cateau-Cambrésis which ended the Italian Wars, France renounced its claims in Italy, but gained certain other territories, including the Pale of Calais and the Three Bishoprics. These acquisitions strengthened French borders while the abdication of Charles V, Holy Roman Emperor in January 1556 and division of his empire between Spain and Austria provided them with greater flexibility in foreign policy. Nostradamus also served King Henry as physician and astrologer. 

In July 1559, Henry was injured in a jousting tournament held to celebrate the treaty and died ten days later after his surgeon, Ambroise Paré, was unable to cure the wound inflicted by Gabriel de Montgomery, the captain of his Scottish Guard. Though he died early, the succession appeared secure as he left four young sons, as well as a wife in Catherine de' Medici, to lead a capable regency during their minority.  Three of those sons would all live long enough to be king themselves, but their ineffectual reigns, and the unpopularity of Catherine's regency, helped to spark the French Wars of Religion between Catholics and Protestants, and an eventual end to the House of Valois as France's ruling dynasty.

Early years

Henry was born in the royal Château de Saint-Germain-en-Laye, near Paris, the son of King Francis I and Claude, Duchess of Brittany, daughter of Louis XII of France and Anne, Duchess of Brittany. Francis and Claude were second cousins, both had Louis I, Duke of Orléans, as a patrilineal great-grandfather, and their marriage strengthened the family's claim to the throne.

Henry's father was captured at the Battle of Pavia in 1525 by the forces of the Holy Roman Emperor Charles V, and held prisoner in Spain. To obtain his release, it was agreed that Henry and his older brother Francis be sent to Spain in his place. They remained in captivity for over four years.

Henry married Catherine de' Medici, a member of the ruling family of Florence, on 28 October 1533, when they were both fourteen years old. The wedding was officiated by Pope Clement VII. At this time, Henry's brother Francis was alive and there was little prospect of Henry coming to the throne. The following year, he became romantically involved with a thirty-five-year-old widow, Diane de Poitiers. Henry and Diane had always been very close: the young lady had fondly embraced Henry on the day he, as a 7-year-old child, set off to captivity in Spain, and the bond had been renewed after his return to France. At the tournament to honor his father's new bride, Eleanor, in 1531, Henry and Francis dressed as chevaliers, and Henry wore Diane's colors.

Extremely confident, mature and intelligent, Diane left Catherine powerless to intervene. She did, however, insist that Henry sleep with Catherine in order to produce heirs to the throne.

When his elder brother Francis died in 1536 after a game of tennis, Henry became heir apparent to the throne.

His attachment to Diane caused a breach with his father in 1544; the royal mistress Anne de Pisseleu d'Heilly persuaded Francis that Henry and Diane were intriguing on behalf of the Constable Montmorency, who had been banished from court in 1540. Francis banished Diane from court. Henry also withdrew to the chateau of Anet; father and son were reconciled in 1545.

He succeeded his father on his 28th birthday and was crowned King of France on 25 July 1547 at Reims Cathedral.

Reign

Attitude towards Protestants 
Henry's reign was marked by the persecution of Protestants, mainly Calvinists known as Huguenots. Henry II severely punished them, particularly the ministers, for example by burning at the stake or cutting off their tongues for uttering heresies.

Henry II was made a Knight of the Garter by Edward VI, King of England, in April 1551.

The Edict of Châteaubriant (27 June 1551) called upon the civil and ecclesiastical courts to detect and punish all heretics and placed severe restrictions on Huguenots, including the loss of one-third of their property to informers, and confiscations. The Edict also strictly regulated publications by prohibiting the sale, importation or printing of any unapproved book. In June 1559, with war against the Habsburgs concluded, Henri established in letters patent his desire to task much of the Gendarmerie that had been involved in the foreign wars with the extirpation of domestic heresy.

Italian War of 1551–1559

The Italian War of 1551–1559 began when Henry declared war on Holy Roman Emperor Charles V with the intent of recapturing Italy and ensuring French, rather than Habsburg, domination of European affairs. Persecution of Protestants at home did not prevent him from becoming allied with German Protestant princes at the Treaty of Chambord in 1552. Simultaneously, the continuation of his father's Franco-Ottoman alliance allowed him to invade the Rhineland while a Franco-Ottoman fleet defended southern France. Although an attempted 1553 invasion of Tuscany ended with defeat at Marciano, in return for his support in the Second Schmalkaldic War, Henry occupied the Three Bishoprics of Toul, Verdun and Metz, acquisitions secured with victory at Renty in 1554.

After the abdication of Charles V in 1556, the Habsburg empire was split between his son Philip II of Spain and brother Emperor Ferdinand I. The focus of Henry's conflict with the Habsburgs shifted to Flanders, where Philip, in conjunction with Emmanuel Philibert, Duke of Savoy, defeated the French at the St Quentin. England's entry into the war later that year led to the French capture of Calais, and French armies plundered Spanish possessions in the Low Countries. However, in April 1559 lack of money and increasing domestic religious tensions led Henry to agree the Peace of Cateau-Cambrésis.

The Peace was signed between Henry and Elizabeth I of England on 2 April and between Henry and Philip of Spain on 3 April 1559 at Le Cateau-Cambrésis. Under its terms, France restored Piedmont and Savoy to Emmanuel Philibert, but retained Saluzzo, Calais and the Three Bishoprics. The agreement was reinforced by a marriage between Henry's sister Margaret and Emmanuel Philibert, while his daughter Elisabeth of Valois became Philip's third wife.

Henry raised the young Mary, Queen of Scots, at his court, hoping to establish a dynastic claim to the Kingdom of Scotland by marrying her to Dauphin Francis on 24 April 1558. Their son would have been King of France and King of Scotland, and also a claimant to the throne of England. Henry had Mary sign secret documents, illegal in Scottish law, that would ensure Valois rule in Scotland even if Mary died without leaving a child by Francis. As it happened, Francis died without issue a year and half after his father, ending the French claim to Scotland.

Patent innovation

Henry II introduced the concept of publishing the description of an invention in the form of a patent. The idea was to require an inventor to disclose his invention in exchange for monopoly rights to the patent. The description is called a patent "specification". The first patent specification was submitted by the inventor Abel Foullon for "Usaige & Description de l'holmetre" (a type of rangefinder). Publication was delayed until after the patent expired in 1561.

Death

Henry II was an avid hunter and a participant in jousts and tournaments. On 30 June 1559, a tournament was held near Place des Vosges to celebrate the Peace of Cateau-Cambrésis with his longtime enemies, the Habsburgs of Austria, and to celebrate the marriage of his daughter Elisabeth of Valois to King Philip II of Spain. During a jousting match, King Henry, wearing the colors of his mistress Diane de Poitiers, was wounded in the eye by a fragment of the splintered lance of Gabriel Montgomery, captain of the King's Scottish Guard. Despite the efforts of royal surgeons Ambroise Paré and Andreas Vesalius, the court doctors ultimately "advocated a wait-and-see strategy"; as a result, the king's untreated eye and brain damage led to his death by sepsis on 10 July 1559. He was buried in a cadaver tomb in Saint Denis Basilica. Henry's death played a significant role in the decline of jousting as a sport, particularly in France.

As Henry lay dying, Queen Catherine limited access to his bedside and denied his mistress Diane de Poitiers permission to see him, even though he repeatedly asked for her. Following his death, Catherine sent Diane into exile, where she lived in comfort on her own properties until her death.

It was the practice to enclose the heart of the king in an urn. The Monument to the Heart of Henry II is in the collection of the Louvre, but was originally in the Chapel of Orleans beneath a pyramid. The original bronze urn holding the king's heart was destroyed during the French Revolution and a replica was made in the 19th century. The marble sculpture of the Three Graces holding the urn, executed from a single piece of marble by Germain Pilon, the sculptor to Catherine de' Medici, survives.

Henry was succeeded by his sickly fifteen-year-old son, Francis II. Francis was married to sixteen-year-old Mary, Queen of Scots, who had been his childhood friend and fiancée since her arrival at the French court when she was five. Francis II died in December 1560, and Mary returned to Scotland in August 1561. Francis II was succeeded by his ten-year-old brother Charles IX. His mother, Catherine de Medici, acted as regent.

Issue

Catherine de' Medici bore ten of Henry's children:
Francis II, born 19 January 1544, who married Mary, Queen of Scots 
Elizabeth of France, born 2 April 1545, who married Philip II, King of Spain
Claude, born 12 November 1547, who married Charles III, Duke of Lorraine
Louis, Duke of Orléans, born 3 February 1549, died 24 October 1550
Charles IX, born 27 June 1550, died 30 May 1574
Henry III, born 19 September 1551, also briefly King of Poland
Margaret, born 14 May 1553, who married Henry III, King of Navarre (later Henry IV of France)
Hercules, born 18 March 1555, later known as Francis, Duke of Alençon and Anjou
Victoire, born 24 June 1556, died 17 August 1556
 Joan, born 24 June 1556, stillborn. 

Henry II also had three illegitimate children:
 By Filippa Duci:
 Diane, duchesse d'Angoulême (1538–1619). At the age of fourteen, she married Orazio Farnese, Duke of Castro, who died in battle in 1553. Her second marriage was to François, Duke of Montmorency.
 By Lady Janet Stewart (1502–1562), the illegitimate daughter of James IV of Scotland:
 Henri d'Angoulême (1551 – June 1586). He was legitimized and became governor of Provence.
 By Nicole de Savigny:
  (1557–1621). He was given the title of Count of Saint-Rémy. One of his last known descendants was Jeanne de Valois-Saint-Rémy, Countess de la Motte, famous for her role in the Affair of the Diamond Necklace at the court of Louis XVI.

Portrayals
Henri or Henry has had four notable portrayals onscreen:

He was played by a young Roger Moore in the 1956 film Diane, opposite Lana Turner in the title role and Marisa Pavan as Catherine de Medici.

In the 1998 film Ever After, the Prince Charming figure, portrayed by Dougray Scott, shares his name with the historical monarch.

In the 2013 CW series Reign, he is played by Alan van Sprang.

In the premiere of The Serpent Queen (2022), a young Henri (Alex Heath) is shown meeting and marrying Catherine De Medici, performing consummation of the marriage, jousting, and snuggling in the older Diane's arms. Beginning with the fourth episode, older Henri is portrayed by Lee Ingleby.

Gallery

Ancestry

References

Sources

External links 

Henry II of France History Today V.59 I9.
Michael Servetus Research- Naturalization Scholarly graphical study on a document issued by Henry II of France in 1548 & 1549

|-

|-

|-

|-

 
1519 births
1559 deaths
16th-century kings of France
16th-century dukes of Brittany
Ancien Régime
Dauphins of France
Dauphins of Viennois
French book and manuscript collectors
House of Valois-Angoulême
Knights of the Garter
Nostradamus
People from Saint-Germain-en-Laye
Sport deaths in France
Burials at the Basilica of Saint-Denis
1540s in France
1550s in France
16th-century peers of France